Politics as usual may refer to:

 An element of democratic structuring, principles defined by Jo Freeman
 Politics as Usual (album), a 2008 album by hip-hop artist Termanology
 Politics as Usual (book), a 2010 book by Thomas Pogge

See also
 "Not Just Politics as Usual", the tagline of the magazine George